Odra Opole is a football club based in Opole, Poland, currently playing in the I liga.

History

Beginnings 
 
The history of Odra Opole began on 16 June 1945, when in the Opole Town Hall, a group of sports officials gathered to form a new Polish sports organisation. Under first chairman, lawyer Leonard Olejnik, Odra organised first post-WWII sports competition in the city: street running (July 1945). In 1948, Odra merged with Lwowianka Opole and Chrobry Groszowice, and in 1948–1958, the club was called Budowlani Opole. By 1950, Budowlani had several departments, including football, track and field, tennis, boxing, ice hockey and volleyball.

In 1951, managed by Mieczysław Bieniek, Budowlani won promotion to the second tier of Polish football system. In 1952, the team achieved promotion to the Ekstraklasa, after the playoffs with Włókniarz Kraków (3–2, 1–1). The team from Opole debuted in the Polish top league on March 15, 1953, losing at home 1–2 to Gwardia Warszawa (the lone goal for Budowlani was scored by Augustyn Poćwa). After only one year, Budowlani was relegated back to the second division.

In 1955, Budowlani, with its top scorer Engelbert Jarek (who had been purchased from Polonia Nysa), returned to the Ekstraklasa. In the same year, Opole's favourites reached the semi-final of the Polish Cup, losing 0–2 to Lechia Gdańsk. Budowlani, whose name was in 1958 changed back to Odra, remained in the Polish top class until 1958. After relegation, Odra quickly returned to Ekstraklasa, and in the early 1960s, it was among the best football teams of the nation.

1960s and 1970s  
In 1960 Odra, which at that time featured several players of the Polish national team was close to winning Polish championship. Managed by Teodor Wieczorek, the team lost in the final round to Gwardia Warszawa, eventually finishing the competition in the fourth place. In 1962, Odra won third place in the Polish Cup, after beating Cracovia 3–1.

In the 1963–64 season, Odra was again close to winning the Polish championship. Managed by Artur Woźniak, it finished in the 3rd spot, the best in club's history, qualifying to the Intertoto Cup.

In 1966, Odra was relegated, to return to the Ekstraklasa in 1967. In the early 1970s, Odra, managed by its former star Engelbert Jarek, had several top class players, including Josef Klose and Zbigniew Gut (11 caps for Poland). Nevertheless, in June 1974 the team was relegated.

In 1975, Engelbert Jarek was replaced by Antoni Piechniczek, former manager of BKS Stal Bielsko-Biala. After one year, Piechniczek won promotion back to the Ekstraklasa. Odra's Wojciech Tyc (1 cap for Poland) was in 1975/76 top scorer of the second division, together with Janusz Kupcewicz of Arka Gdynia. With new generation of talented players, such as Roman Wójcicki and Józef Młynarczyk, Odra on June 18, 1977 won the League Cup, beating 3–1 Polish runner-up Widzew Łódź, earning a spot in the 1977–78 UEFA Cup. There, it lost in the first round to East German side 1. FC Magdeburg (1:2, 1:1).

In the autumn of 1978, Odra was a sensation of the Ekstraklasa. After winning several games, including 5–3 vs. Legia Warsaw in Warsaw (29 October 1978), and 3–1 vs. Ruch Chorzów in Opole (19 November 1978), Odra emerged as the autumn round champion. In the spring of 1979 however, Odra lost several important games, eventually finishing the championship in the 5th spot. After this season, Antoni Piechniczek resigned, to be replaced by Józef Zwierzyna.

1980s and 2000s  
In 1979/1980 Odra finished in the 9th spot, and in 1980/1981, it was relegated, not to return to the Ekstraklasa. Odra's last so far game in the top Polish class took place on 14 June 1981 vs Legia in Warsaw (1–1, goal by Wojciech Tyc). After relegation, Odra remained in the second division, to be relegated to the third level, in June 1984. With one exception (1985/86), Odra remained in the third league until June 1997. After promotion, the team finished in the 17th spot in the 1997/1998 season of the second division. Odra was not relegated, however, due to a merger with Varta Start Namysłów.

With a new sponsor, Odra was a sensation in the autumn 2000 round of the second division. With 13 victories, 3 ties and 3 losses, it was the leader of its group. In the spring of 2001 however, Odra lost several games and finished in the 4th spot. As was later revealed, Odra's successes of autumn 2000 were based on corruption, as games were set up by Ryszard Forbrich, aka Fryzjer. In June 2002 Odra was relegated to the third level, to return to the second division in June 2006, after winning playoffs with Radomiak Radom (1–1, 1–1 and 4–2 in the penalty shootout). In October 2006, for the first time in club's history, a foreigner, Dutchman Guido Vreuls was named Odra's chairman. On 9 January 2008, another Dutchman, Rob Delahaije, became Odra's manager, but his record was very disappointing: 4 ties, 2 losses.

In 2009, Odra Opole withdrew from the Polish First League after becoming insolvent. In June of the same year, a new club by the name of Oderka Opole was established. Oderka plans to apply for acceptance into the Polish Fourth League to which Odra's reserves had won promotion. Oderka Opole played in Opolska (Opole) Group in Polish Fourth League and promoted to Opolsko-Slaska (Opole-Silesia) Group of Polish Third League in 2009–10 season. Oderka renamed her name to traditional one in 2011–12 season and promoted to Zachodnia (West) group of Polish Second League in 2012–13 season. However, Odra's return to third level was brief and relegated again to fourth one due to reducing teams for unifying third level despite finishing as 12th. Odra eventually won promotion to the third tier in 2016, and then to Polish First League (2nd tier) in 2017. In the 2021–22 season Odra qualified to promotion play-offs to the Ekstraklasa, but lost to the final winner Korona Kielce.

League participations 
 First Level: 1953, 1956–1958 (3 seasons), 1960–1966 (7 seasons), 1967–1970, 1971–1974, 1976–1981
 Second Level: 1951–1952 (2 seasons), 1954–1955 (2 seasons), 1959, 1966–1967, 1970–1971, 1974–1976, 1981–1984, 1985–1986, 1987–1988, 1997–2002, 2006–2009, 2017–
 Third Level: 1948–1950 (3 seasons), 1984–1985, 1986–1987, 1988–1997, 2002–2006, 2013–2014, 2016–2017
 Fourth Level: 2010–2013, 2014–2016
 Fifth Level: 2009–2010

Recent seasons 

1: promotion play-off won.

Honours

National honours 
Polish League Cup
Winners (1): 1977
3rd place in the Ekstraklasa: 1963/1964
3rd place in Polish Cup: 1961/1962
Semi-final of the Polish Cup: 1954/1955, 1961/1962, 1966/1967, 1980/1981, 2000/2001Youth Teams:'''
Polish U-19 Champion: 1972
 Polish U-19 Runner-up: 1968, 1976, 1981
 Polish U-19 Bronze Medal: 1984

International honours  
 1961/1962 UEFA Intertoto Cup 
 Group stage: Slovan Bratislava 1:1, 1:8, Wiener AC 1:4, 2:0, Vorwärts Berlin 1:2, 2:1 
 1963/1964 Intertoto UEFA Cup 
Group stage: Hajduk Split 0:1, 1:0, FSV Zwickau 1:0, 1:1, HC Kladno 1:1, 4:0. 
 1/8 final: IFK Norrköping 3:2, 2:0 
 Quarterfinal: Slovan Bratislava 0:0, 1:1 
 Semifinal: Polonia Bytom 1:2, 0:0 
 1964/1965 Intertoto UEFA Cup 
 Group stage: PFC Spartak Pleven 1:0, 1:1, 1. FC Tatran Prešov 1:1, 1:2, FC Karl-Marx-Stadt 1:2, 2:0 
1968 Intertoto UEFA Cup 
 Group stage: Jednota Trencin 0:0, 2:0, 1. FC Magdeburg 2:0, 1:0, Hvidovre IF 1:2, 2:0 
 1969	Intertoto UEFA Cup 
 Group stage: FC La Chaux-de-Fonds 2:3, 3:0, SK Beveren-Waas 0:0, 2:0, Boldklubben 1913 2:0, 2:1 
 1972 Intertoto UEFA Cup 
 Group stage: Boldklubben Frem 1:2, 4:0, Rot-Weiß Oberhausen 0:1, 4:3, SK Voest Linz 2:0, 0:2 
 1977-78 UEFA Cup: 1. FC Magdeburg 1:2, 1:1

Club records  
 First Game in the Ekstraklasa: 15 March 1953, Budowlani Opole – Gwardia Warszawa 1:2 (0:0), 
 First Point in the Ekstraklasa: 19 April 1953 Budowlani Opole – Gornik Radlin 1:1 (1:1), 
 First Ekstraklasa victory: 7 June 1953, Budowlani Opole – Legia Warszawa 3:2 (2:1), 
 Record Victory in the Ekstraklasa: 8 September 1961: Odra Opole – Lechia Gdańsk 9:2 (5:0), 
 Record Loss in the Ekstraklasa: 19 August 1964 Polonia Bytom – Odra Opole 7:0 (5:0), 
 Longest Winning Streak in the Ekstraklasa: 7 victories, 1979, 
 Record All-time Victory, Third League game 1984/1985: Odra Opole – WKS Wielun 13:0 (5:0)

Odra's Players in Polish National Team  
 Engelbert Jarek, 3 games, 1 goal 
 Bernard Blaut, 1 game 
 Henryk Szczepański, 28 games 
 Norbert Gajda, 7 games, 2 goals, 
 Konrad Kornek, 15 games, 
 Henryk Brejza, 9 games, 
 Antoni Kot, 1 game 
 Zbigniew Gut, 11 games, 
 Bohdan Masztaler, 10 games, 
 Wojciech Tyc, 1 game, 
 Zbigniew Kwaśniewski, 2 games, 
 Roman Wójcicki, 11 games, 
 Józef Młynarczyk, 5 games, 
 Jozef Adamiec, 1 game.

Current squad

Out on loan

References

External links 
 Official website 
 Website dedicated to the history of Odra Opole 
 Odra Opole at the 90minut.pl website 

 
Football clubs in Poland
Association football clubs established in 1945
1945 establishments in Poland